Miloš Joksić (born 26 March 1968) is a Serbian football manager and He is the currently assistant manager of Thai League 1 club Muangthong United.

Career
In July 2012, Joksić resigned as manager of Phuket in Thailand. He later returned to Serbia and served as manager of Mladenovac in 2013.

In June 2016, just a month after leaving Pattaya United, Joksić was appointed as manager of fellow Thai club Nakhon Ratchasima. He parted ways with them in August 2019.

References

External links
 

1968 births
Living people
Sportspeople from Belgrade
Serbian football managers
FK Radnički Pirot managers
Milos Joksic
Milos Joksic
Milos Joksic
Serbian expatriate football managers
Expatriate football managers in Thailand
Serbian expatriate sportspeople in Thailand